Salvatore Crippa (1914–1971) was an Italian road cyclist.

Giro d'Italia

He finished 4th overall at the 1946 Giro d'Italia.  This was his best of five finishes (and one withdrawal), with two other top ten finishes - 6th at the 1939 Giro d'Italia and 8th at the 1947 Giro d'Italia.  He also won the 5th stage at the 1938 Giro d'Italia.

Monuments
His best finish among the cycling classics was a third place at the 1939 Giro di Lombardia, considered a monument.

Other events
In 1936 he won the Piccolo Giro di Lombardia.  He was also three-time winner of the Medaglia d'Oro Città di Monza and three-time winner of the Coppa d'Inverno - Biassono.  He also finished 9th at the 1946 La Course du Tour de France.

References

1914 births
1971 deaths
Italian male cyclists
Italian Giro d'Italia stage winners
Italian atheists
Sportspeople from Monza
Cyclists from the Province of Monza e Brianza